Garner on Language and Writing  , published in early 2008,   contains more than a hundred of Bryan A. Garner's essays published between 1987 and 2007 but never before collected in book form.

2008 non-fiction books
Books about writing
Essay collections
Plain English
Essays about literature